Lajeado is an important city in the valley of the Taquari River, Rio Grande do Sul, Brazil. The population is 97,432 (2022 est.) in an area of 90.09 km². Some of the largest distributors of food and fuel of the state are found in Lajeado. The city is mostly urban. Its current mayor is Marcelo Caumo. It was founded on January 26, 1891, when it was separated from the municipality of Estrela. It was colonized by German and Italian people.

The city has a university: Univates.

Notable people
 Filipe Catto (1987–), singer and songwriter

References

 
Municipalities in Rio Grande do Sul